Arkansas Highway 82 may refer to:
Arkansas Highway 82 (1926), now numbered 152
U.S. Route 82 in Arkansas, entered Arkansas ca. 1933